Rabo may refer to:

 Ali Rabo, a footballer from Burkina Faso
 Rabo Saminou, a footballer from Niger
 Various subsidiaries, brands, sports sponsorships etc. of Rabobank, a Dutch financial services group